Waluscha De Sousa (born 28 November 1979) is an Indian actress and model. She made her debut in the 2016 Hindi film Fan.

Early life and education 
Waluscha De Sousa hails from Goa and is of paternal Portuguese and maternal German descent. She was discovered by famous Indian fashion designer Wendell Rodricks at the age of 16.

Waluscha lived by the beach and was an athlete in her growing years. She loves the outdoors and is a complete adventurer. She studied at 'Our Lady of the Rosary' at Dona Paula in Panjim and later completed her graduation at St. Xavier's College, Mapusa.

Career 
Waluscha modeled for leading designers in the country and subsequently took part in the Miss India pageant, where she secured herself the "Miss Body Beautiful" title. She did her first TV commercial for Pepsi with Shah Rukh Khan at the age of 17. Years later, she once again featured in a Hyundai commercial with the actor. She has also been the face of brands including Jaipur Jewels, L'Oreal, Avon Haircare naturals, Falguni and Shane's new Peacock collection 2016.

In 2016 Waluscha made her debut with Shahrukh Khan's film Fan.

Personal life 
She was married to Marc Robinson in Goa. The couple have three children, Chanel Robinson, Brooklyn Robinson and Sienna Robinson. The couple filed for a divorce in 2013.

Magazine covers 
 FHM (India)
Verve
Harper’s Bazaar
Bollywood FilmFame Cover 
Travel + Leisure Magazine (India)
Viva Goa
Femina Salon and Spa
Smartlife 
 Elle beauty
 GQ India
 Vogue beauty editorial
 Cine Blitz
 Man's World

Filmography

Television

References

External links 

 
 

Actresses from Goa
Female models from Goa
Indian film actresses
Actresses of European descent in Indian films
Indian people of German descent
Indian people of Portuguese descent
Portuguese people of Indian descent
Portuguese people of German descent
Actresses in Hindi cinema
Actresses in Malayalam cinema
Living people
1981 births